Chal Kareh (also Romanized as Chāl Kareh) is a village in Shahi Rural District, Sardasht District, Dezful County, Khuzestan Province, Iran. At the 2006 census, its population was 66, in 14 families.

References 

Populated places in Dezful County